The 1997 Women's County One-Day Championship was the inaugural cricket Women's County Championship season, succeeding the Women's Area Championship. It took place in July and saw 7 county teams, 3 county Second XIs and 6 regional teams compete in a series of divisions. Yorkshire Women won the title, topping Division 1 unbeaten.

Competition format 
Teams played matches within a series of divisions with the winners of the top division being crowned County Champions. Matches were played using a one day format with 50 overs per side.

The championship works on a points system with positions within the divisions being based on the total points. Points were awarded as follows:

Win: 12 points. 
Tie:  6 points. 
Loss: Bonus points.
No Result: 11 points.
Abandoned: 11 points.

Up to five batting and five bowling points per side were also available.

Teams
The 1997 Championship consisted of 16 teams, with Divisions One and Two consisting of six teams apiece and Division Three with four teams. Teams played each other once.

Qualifier

Division One 

Source: Cricket Archive

Division Two 

Source: Cricket Archive

Division Three 

Source: Cricket Archive

Statistics

Most runs

Source: CricketArchive

Most wickets

Source: CricketArchive

References

1997